Novak Djokovic defeated Tomáš Berdych in the final, 7–5, 4–6, 6–3 to win the singles tennis title at the 2015 Monte-Carlo Masters. It was his second Monte-Carlo Masters title, and he became the first man to win the first three ATP Tour Masters 1000 titles of the season.

Stan Wawrinka was the defending champion, but lost in the third round to Grigor Dimitrov.

Seeds
The top eight seeds receive a bye into the second round.

Draw

Finals

Top half

Section 1

Section 2

Bottom half

Section 3

Section 4

Qualifying

Seeds

Qualifiers

Lucky losers

Qualifying draw

First qualifier

Second qualifier

Third qualifier

Fourth qualifier

Fifth qualifier

Sixth qualifier

Seventh qualifier

References

External links
 Main draw
 Qualifying draw

Singles